Anti-obesity medication or weight loss medications are pharmacological agents that reduce or control weight. These medications alter one of the fundamental processes of the human body, weight regulation, by altering either appetite, or absorption of calories. The main treatment modalities for overweight and individuals with obesity remain dieting (healthy diet and caloric restriction) and physical exercise.

In the United States, orlistat (Xenical) and semaglutide (Wegovy) are approved by the FDA for long-term use.

Because of potential side effects, and limited evidence of small benefits in weight reduction for children and adolescents with obesity, it is recommended that anti-obesity medications only be prescribed for obesity where it is hoped that the benefits of the treatment outweigh its risks.  In the United States, the Food and Drug Administration advocates that people with either a body-mass index of at least 30, or a body-mass index of at least 27 with at least one weight-related comorbidity, represent a patient population with sufficiently high baseline health risks to justify the use of anti-obesity medication.

Mechanisms of action
Anti-obesity medications may operate through one or more of the following mechanisms:
 Catecholamine releasing agents such as amphetamine, phentermine, and related substituted amphetamines (e.g., bupropion) which act as appetite suppressants are the main tools used for the treatment of obesity.
 GLP-1 analogues such as tirzepatide, semaglutide, and liraglutide slow gastric emptying and also have neurologically-driven effects on appetite.

History
The first described attempts at producing weight loss are those of Soranus of Ephesus, a Greek physician, in the second century AD. He prescribed elixirs of laxatives and purgatives, as well as heat, massage, and exercise. This remained the mainstay of treatment for well over a thousand years. It was not until the 1920s and 1930s that new treatments began to appear. Based on its effectiveness for hypothyroidism, thyroid hormone became a popular treatment for obesity in euthyroid people. It had a modest effect but produced the symptoms of hyperthyroidism as a side effect, such as palpitations and difficulty sleeping. 2,4-Dinitrophenol (DNP) was introduced in 1933; this worked by uncoupling the biological process of oxidative phosphorylation in mitochondria, causing them to produce heat instead of ATP. The most significant side effect was a sensation of warmth, frequently with sweating. Overdose, although rare, led to a rise in body temperature and, ultimately, fatal hyperthermia. By the end of 1938 DNP had fallen out of use because the FDA had become empowered to put pressure on manufacturers, who voluntarily withdrew it from the market.

Amphetamines (marketed as Benzedrine) became popular for weight loss during the late 1930s. They worked primarily by suppressing appetite, and had other beneficial effects such as increased alertness. Use of amphetamines increased over the subsequent decades, including Obetrol and culminating in the "rainbow diet pill" regime. This was a combination of multiple pills, all thought to help with weight loss, taken throughout the day. Typical regimens included stimulants, such as amphetamines, as well as thyroid hormone, diuretics, digitalis, laxatives, and often a barbiturate to suppress the side effects of the stimulants. In 1967/1968 a number of deaths attributed to diet pills triggered a Senate investigation and the gradual implementation of greater restrictions on the market. While rainbow diet pills were banned in the US in the late 1960s, they reappeared in South America and Europe in the 1980s. Eventually rainbow diet pills were re-introduced into the US by the 2000s and led to additional adverse health effects.

In 1959, phentermine had been FDA approved and fenfluramine in 1973. The two were no more popular than other medications until in 1992 a researcher reported that when combined the two caused a 10% weight loss which was maintained for more than two years. Fen-phen was born and rapidly became the most commonly prescribed diet medication. Dexfenfluramine (Redux) was developed in the mid-1990s as an alternative to fenfluramine with fewer side-effects, and received regulatory approval in 1996. However, this coincided with mounting evidence that the combination could cause valvular heart disease in up to 30% of those who had taken it, leading to withdrawal of Fen-phen and dexfenfluramine from the market in September 1997.
Medical complications included fatal pulmonary hypertension and heart valve damage due to Redux and Fen-phen, and hemorrhagic stroke due to phenylpropanolamine.

Since the introduction of medicines for the management of obesity in the 1930s, many compounds have been tried. Most of them reduce body weight by small amounts, and several of them are no longer marketed for obesity because of their side effects. Out of 25 anti-obesity medications withdrawn from the market between 1964 and 2009, 23 acted by altering the functions of chemical neurotransmitters in the brain. The most common side effects of these drugs that led to withdrawals were mental disturbances, cardiac side effects, and drug abuse or drug dependence. Deaths were reportedly associated with seven products. Ephedra was removed from the US market in 2004 over concerns that it raises blood pressure and could lead to strokes and death.

Medication
Some patients find that diet and exercise is not a viable option; for these patients, anti-obesity medications can be a last resort.  In the United States, semaglutide (Wegovy) is approved by the FDA for chronic weight management.  Some other prescription weight loss medications are stimulants, which are recommended only for short-term use, and thus are of limited usefulness for patients who may need to reduce weight over months or years.

GLP-1 analogs and agonists 
Glucagon-like peptide-1 (GLP-1) are peptide incretin hormones involved in blood sugar control.

In 2021, one review concluded that "Currently, gut peptide analogues such as semaglutide [...] and [...] tirzepatide are the furthest advanced in clinical development". In 2022, a further review found that these two peptides are "the most promising candidates for the upcoming battle in the anti-obesity market". An article in The New York Times notes the high costs for semaglutide and potentially tirzepatide, suggesting that many people "who could most benefit from weight loss may be unable to afford such expensive drugs".

Semaglutide 

Semaglutide (Ozempic) is a GLP-1 analogue, administered once weekly. It is more effective than exenatide. In June 2021, the US Food and Drug Administration (FDA) approved semaglutide injection sold under the brand name Wegovy for long-term weight management in adults. Wegovy was approved for medical use ("used together with diet and physical activity") in the European Union in January 2022.

Tirzepatide 
A phase III clinical trial indicated that tirzepatide could be used for substantial weight loss. Specifically, phase-3 clinical trials found that after 71 weeks patients had lost 16% of their starting body weight on average. On 13 May 2022, it was approved under the name Mounjaro for type-2 diabetes (though not specifically for weight loss) .

Exenatide 
Exenatide (Byetta) is a long-acting analogue of the hormone GLP-1, which the intestines secrete in response to the presence of food. Among other effects, GLP-1 delays stomach emptying and promotes a feeling of fullness after eating. Some people with obesity are deficient in GLP-1, and dieting reduces GLP-1 further. Byetta is currently available as a treatment for Diabetes mellitus type 2. Some, but not all, patients find that they lose substantial weight when taking Byetta. Drawbacks of Byetta include that it must be injected subcutaneously twice daily, and that it causes severe nausea in some patients, especially when therapy is initiated. As of 2015, Byetta was recommended only for patients with Type 2 Diabetes.

Liraglutide 
Liraglutide (Saxenda) is another GLP-1 analogue for daily administration, approved 2014.

Orlistat
Orlistat (Xenical) reduces intestinal fat absorption by inhibiting the enzyme pancreatic lipase. Frequent oily bowel movements steatorrhea is a possible side effect of using Orlistat. But if fat in the diet is reduced, symptoms often improve. Originally available only by prescription, it was approved by the FDA for over-the-counter sale in February 2007. On 26 May 2010, the U.S. Food and Drug Administration (FDA) has approved a revised label for Xenical to include new safety information about cases of severe liver injury that have been reported rarely with the use of this medication. Of the 40 million users of orlistat worldwide, 13 cases of severe liver damage have been reported.

Cetilistat
Cetilistat is a medication designed to treat obesity. It acts in the same way as the older medication orlistat by inhibiting pancreatic lipase, an enzyme that breaks down triglycerides in the intestine. Without this enzyme, triglycerides from the diet are prevented from being hydrolyzed into absorbable free fatty acids and are excreted undigested.

A 2010 phase 2 trial found cetilistat significantly reduced weight and was better tolerated than orlistat. It has not been approved in the US.

Phentermine/topiramate 

The combination of phentermine and topiramate, brand name Qsymia (formerly Qnexa) was approved by the U.S. FDA on 17 July 2012, as an obesity treatment complementary to a diet and exercise regimen. In October 2012, the European Medicines Agency, by contrast, rejected the combination (Qsiva) as a treatment for obesity, citing concerns about long-term effects on the heart and blood vessels, mental health and cognitive side-effects.

Naltrexone/bupropion 

Naltrexone/bupropion is a combination medication used for weight loss in those that have either obesity or overweight with some weight-related illnesses. It combines low doses of bupropion and naltrexone. Both medications have individually shown some evidence of effectiveness in weight loss, and the combination has been shown to have some synergistic effects on weight.
In September 2014, a sustained release formulation of the medication was approved for marketing in the United States under the brand name Contrave. The combination was approved for use in the European Union in March 2015, under the brand name Mysimba.

Gelesis100

Gelesis100 (sold under the brand name "Plenity") is an oral superabsorbent hydrogel used for weight loss in the treatment of obesity and overweight. As Gelesis100 absorbs water, it expands in the stomach and small bowel, which may result in satiety. Gelesis100 was approved in April 2019 by the US Food and Drug Administration as a medical device. In 2022, the American Gastroenterology Association recommended the use of Gelesis100 be limited to clinical trials due to limited evidence.

Withdrawn

Lorcaserin 
Lorcaserin (Belviq) was approved 28 June 2012 for obesity with other co-morbidities. The average weight loss by study participants was modest, but the most common side effects of the medication are considered benign. It reduces appetite by activating a type of serotonin receptor known as the 5-HT2C receptor in a region of the brain called the hypothalamus, which is known to control appetite.
This drug has now been withdrawn from the market because a safety clinical trial shows an increased occurrence of cancer.

Sibutramine 
Sibutramine (Meridia), which acts in the brain to inhibit deactivation of the neurotransmitters, thereby decreasing appetite was approved in 1997 and withdrawn from the United States and Canadian markets in October 2010 due to cardiovascular concerns.

As late as 2004, some held that Meridia was a harmless medication for fighting obesity: the US District Court of the Northern District of Ohio rejected 113 cases complaining about the negative effects of the medication, stating that the clients lacked supporting facts and that the representatives involved were not qualified enough.

In October Sibutramine was withdrawn from the market for cardiovascular side effects like stroke or heart attack, sometimes fatal, in the United States, the UK, the EU, Australia, Canada, Hong Kong and Colombia.

Rimonabant 
Rimonabant (also known as SR141716; trade names Acomplia and Zimulti) was an anorectic antiobesity medication that was first approved in Europe in 2006 but was withdrawn worldwide in 2008 due to serious psychiatric side effects; it was never approved in the United States.  It works via a specific blockade of the endocannabinoid system. It has been developed from the knowledge that cannabis smokers often experience hunger, which is often referred to as "the munchies".

Rimonabant is an inverse agonist for the cannabinoid receptor CB1 and was the first medication approved in that class.

Off label and experimental medications 
 Metformin
In people with type 2 diabetes mellitus and for those taking clozapine for schizophrenia, the medication metformin (Glucophage) can reduce weight, but in others it is not approved as an anti-obesity medication.  Metformin limits the amount of glucose that is produced by the liver as well as increases muscle consumption of glucose. It also helps in increasing the body's response to insulin.
 Tesofensine (NS2330) is a serotonin–noradrenaline–dopamine reuptake inhibitor from the phenyltropane family of medications, which as of 2009, was being developed for the treatment of obesity. Tesofensine was originally developed by a Danish biotechnology company, NeuroSearch, who transferred the rights to Saniona in 2014. Tesofensine has been evaluated in Phase 1 and Phase 2 human clinical studies with the aim of investigating treatment potential with regards to obesity.
 Amylin/pramlinatide
Pramlintide, originally developed by Amylin Pharmaceuticals, now owned by AstraZeneca Pharmaceuticals, is an injectable analogue of amylin (secreted by the Beta cells of the pancreas in a fixed ratio when insulin is released and activated) an approved for treating diabetes type 1 and 2. It is in testing for treating obesity in non-diabetics.

Nutraceuticals, herbal and alternative medicine

Dietary supplements, foodstuffs, or programs for weight loss are heavily promoted through advertisements in print, on television, and on the internet. The US Food and Drug Administration recommends caution with use of these products, since many of the claims of safety and effectiveness are unsubstantiated, and many of the studies purporting to demonstrate their effectiveness are funded by the manufactures and suffer a high degree of bias. Individuals with anorexia nervosa or bulimia nervosa, and some athletes, try to control body weight with diet pills, laxatives, or diuretic medications, although the latter two generally have no impact on body fat and only cause short-lived weight-loss through dehydration. Both diuretics and laxatives can cause electrolyte abnormalities which may cause cognitive, heart, and muscle problems, and can be fatal.

Canadian clinical practice 2006 guidelines state that there is insufficient evidence to recommend in favor of or against using herbal medicine, dietary supplements or homeopathy against obesity. Some botanical supplements include high dosages of compounds found in plants with stimulant effects including yohimbine and higenamine.

Quality control

Many products marketed as botanical weight loss supplements actually contain unapproved stimulants including analogues of amphetamine, methamphetamine and ephedra.

Caffeine, coffeine and green tea 

Caffeine, coffeine and green tea can suppress appetite and decrease caloric intake (food consumption). It can also cause beneficial changes in fat metabolism. According to a review, habitual intake of 3 to 4 cups of coffee appears to be safe and to be associated with the most robust beneficial effects.

Berberin 
Berberine can be useful in obesity treatment and prevention through a range of mechanisms, including effects on PEPCK, the gut microbiome, AMPK and glucose metabolism. A review found that berberine can elicit clinical benefits for various diseases at standard doses and has low toxicity. The (possibly relatively small but useful) anti-obesity effects (as well as effects on associationed issues such as via effects on insulin receptors) are thought to partly stem from its effects on the microbiome, such as enrichment of butyrate-producing bacteria which can upregulate GLP-1 and PYY. Berberine can modulate the diversity of the gut microbiome at the dose of 500 mg/day.

Forskolin 
Forskolin increases cAMP levels. Results from clinical trials "lead to speculation that forskolin might be helpful in the management of overweight". While it apparently reduced body fat levels in people with obesity, additional trials with high quality are required.

Oleuropein 
Oleuropein, as contained in olive leaf extract, has anti-obesity properties, which may make it useful as a supportive treatment.

Caloric restriction mimetic 

Accumulating evidence demonstrated anti-obesity impact of caloric restriction mimetics (CRMs) like spermidine. Such nutraceuticals exert effects similar to caloric restriction. However, more studies are needed and some CRMs may not have effects useful for the treatment or prevention of obesity – for resveratrol in specific "current evidence does not fully support its use to prevent or treat age- or obesity-related diseases".

Conjugated linoleic acid 
Conjugated linoleic acid is claimed to help reduce obesity but it is ineffective for this use.

ECA stack 
The ECA Stack cannot be marketed in most developed countries but used to be marketed as a weight loss aid; it provided modest short term weight loss but evidence for the long term was lacking. Additionally there was a risk of adverse effects on the cardiovascular, mental, digestive, and nervous systems.

Pyruvate
Pyruvate, which is found in red apples, cheese, and red wine, is sometimes marketed as a weight loss supplement, but as of 1999 has not been thoroughly studied and its weight loss effect has not been demonstrated.

Side effects
Some anti-obesity medications can have severe, even, lethal side effects, fen-phen being a famous example. Fen-phen was reported through the FDA to cause abnormal echocardiograms, heart valve problems, and rare valvular diseases. One of, if not the first, to sound alarms was Sir Arthur MacNalty, Chief Medical Officer (United Kingdom). As early as the 1930s, he warned against the use of 2,4-Dinitrophenol as an anti-obesity medication and the injudicious and/or medically unsupervised use of thyroid hormone to achieve weight reduction. The side effects are often associated with the medication's mechanism of action.  In general, stimulants carry a risk of high blood pressure, faster heart rate, palpitations, closed-angle glaucoma, drug addiction, restlessness, agitation, and insomnia.

Another medication, orlistat, blocks absorption of dietary fats, and as a result may cause oily spotting bowel movements (steatorrhea), oily stools, stomach pain, and flatulence. A similar medication designed for patients with Type 2 diabetes is Acarbose; which partially blocks absorption of carbohydrates in the small intestine, and produces similar side effects including stomach pain and flatulence.

Research
Other classes of medications in development include lipase inhibitors, similar to orlistat. Another lipase inhibitor, called GT 389–255, was being developed by Peptimmune (licensed from Genzyme). This was a novel combination of an inhibitor and a polymer designed to bind the undigested triglycerides therefore allowing increased fat expulsion without side effects such as oily stools that occur with orlistat. The development stalled as Phase 1 trials were conducted in 2004 and there was no further human clinical development afterward. In 2011, Peptimmune filed for Chapter 7 Liquidation.

See also 
 AMP-activated protein kinase
 Ghrelin
 Probiotics
 Vegetable#Nutrition and health
 Weight loss effects of water

References

Further reading

External links 
 
 Prescription Medications for the Treatment of Obesity